Sharam is a commonly used name originating from Iran.

Sharam may also refer to:

Places
Sharam, Iran, a village

People
Sharam Kohan, lawyer, mathematical logician, economist and human rights defender
Sharam Namdarian (born 1990), life coach, dating coach and surrender coach.
Sharam Tayebi is an Iranian-American progressive house DJ and producer.
Max Sharam (born 1969), Australian interdisciplinary artist and singer-songwriter
Mohammed Sharam, the only surviving perpetrator of the 1985 Rome and Vienna airport attacks

Art, entertainment, and media
Sharam (film) (1982), a film from India

See also
Sarum (disambiguation)
Sharam Q, a Japanese rock band